Hermes Quijada International Airport  is an airport in Tierra del Fuego Province, Argentina serving the city of Río Grande.

The airport is operated by Aeropuertos Argentina 2000.

The runway has an additional  blast pad on Runway 26. East approach and departure may be over the water.

The Rio Grande VOR-DME (Ident: GRA) and non-directional beacon (Ident: GRA) are located on the field.

Airlines and destinations

Statistics

See also

Transport in Argentina
List of airports in Argentina

References

External links
OpenStreetMap - Rio Grande Airport
Organismo Regulador del Sistema Nacional de Aeropuertos

Airports in Argentina
Argentine Naval Air Bases
Buildings and structures in Tierra del Fuego Province, Argentina